Agnes Penemulungu is a Member of Parliament for Lilongwe South in Malawi. She was elected on President Mutharika's Democratic Progressive Party ticket.

Family
She is married to Malawian businessman Lucky Penemulungu.

Mutharika's death
Penemulungu was in a meeting with Bingu wa Mutharika when he collapsed and died. Mutharika's death led to the constitutional crisis in Malawi. She went on bed rest shortly after. She was questioned officially by the Commission of Inquiry ordered by Malawi President Joyce Banda as part of an information gathering exercise to establish circumstances surrounding the President Mutharika's death but has commented that he "stopped talking and collapsed."

References

Democratic Progressive Party (Malawi) politicians
Living people
Date of birth missing (living people)
Members of the National Assembly (Malawi)
Malawian women in politics
21st-century women politicians
Year of birth missing (living people)